Martin Knight (born 28 December 1983 in Wellington) is a professional squash player who represents New Zealand. He reached a career-high world ranking of World No. 38 in March 2010. He won a bronze medal in the men's doubles at the 2006 World Doubles and a silver medal in the mixed doubles at the 2010 Commonwealth Games.

References

External links 
 
 
 

1983 births
Living people
New Zealand male squash players
Commonwealth Games medallists in squash
Commonwealth Games silver medallists for New Zealand
Squash players at the 2006 Commonwealth Games
Squash players at the 2010 Commonwealth Games
Squash players at the 2014 Commonwealth Games
Medallists at the 2010 Commonwealth Games